Switzerland County is a county in the southeast corner of the U.S. state of Indiana. As of the 2020 United States Census, the population was 9,737. The county seat is Vevay, one of two incorporated towns in the county.

History
In 1787, the fledgling United States defined the Northwest Territory, which included the area of present-day Indiana. In 1800, Congress separated Ohio from the Northwest Territory, designating the rest of the land as the Indiana Territory. President Thomas Jefferson chose William Henry Harrison as the territory's first governor, and Vincennes was established as the territorial capital. After the Michigan Territory was separated and the Illinois Territory was formed, Indiana was reduced to its current size and geography. By December 1816 the Indiana Territory was admitted to the Union as a state.

Starting in 1794, Native American titles to Indiana lands were extinguished by usurpation, purchase, or war and treaty. The United States acquired land from the Native Americans in the 1809 treaty of Fort Wayne, and by the treaty of St. Mary's in 1818, the SE portion of Indiana Territory was acquired for settlement.

The area included in present-day Switzerland County was first placed in Knox County, formed in 1790. Parts of that extremely large county were partitioned off in 1803 to form Dearborn County and in 1810 to form Jefferson County. Settlers had been pouring into the extreme SE part of the Indiana Territory starting in 1795, and by 1814 there was sufficient population to form a local governing body. Accordingly, the state legislature authorized Switzerland County effective 1 October 1814, partitioning portions of Dearborn and Jefferson counties to make the creation. Four fledgling settlements were considered as the seat of government (Vevay, Little York [present-day Florence], Troy [present-day Patriot], and Center Square). Center Square was nearest the geographic center and was the presumed site, but Vevay carried the day.

Several early settlers were originally from Switzerland. The first was probably Heathcoat Pickett, in 1795. He was followed by John James Dufour (1796), and the Dickason, Cotton, and Rayl families in 1798. Pickett also made the area's first flatboats; he floated them (loaded with goods for sale) to New Orleans and sold the entire package, then walked back to Switzerland County. He made 20 such trips. Early county residents noted the passage of the first steamboat on the Ohio River in 1811; this form of transport quickly transformed the river into a conduit for commerce and travel. Although Indiana was criss-crossed with railroad tracks during the nineteenth century, none was laid to Switzerland County. This hindered its growth after the decline of steamboat travel.

Industrial wine grape production in Switzerland County earned the area the title "The Rhineland of America".

Geography
Switzerland County lies at the SE tip of Indiana, with its southeastern border defined by the Ohio River; the state of Kentucky abuts on the opposite shore. Its rolling hills were originally completely wooded. Its more flat areas have been cleared for agricultural or urban use, but its many drainages are still wooded.

Adjacent counties

 Ohio County - north
 Boone County, Kentucky - northeast
 Gallatin County, Kentucky - east
 Carroll County, Kentucky - south
 Jefferson County - west
 Ripley County - northwest

Incorporated towns
 Patriot
 Vevay (county seat)

Unincorporated towns

 Aaron
 Allensville
 Antioch
 Avonburg
 Bennington
 Braytown
 Center Square
 East Enterprise (census-designated place)
 Fairview
 Florence (census-designated place)
 Five Points
 Gurley Corner
 Jacksonville
 Lamb
 Long Run
 Markland
 Moorefield
 Mount Sterling
 Pleasant
 Quercus Grove
 Searcy Crossroads

Townships

 Cotton
 Craig
 Jefferson
 Pleasant
 Posey
 York

Highways

  Indiana State Road 56
  Indiana State Road 101
  Indiana State Road 129
  Indiana State Road 156
  Indiana State Road 250

Climate and weather

Government

The county government is a constitutional body, and is granted specific powers by the Constitution of Indiana, and by the Indiana Code.

County Council: The legislative branch of the county government; controls spending and revenue collection in the county. Representatives are elected to four-year terms from county districts. They set salaries, the annual budget, and special spending. The council has limited authority to impose local taxes, in the form of an income and property tax that is subject to state level approval, excise taxes, and service taxes.

Board of Commissioners: The executive body of the county; commissioners are elected county-wide to staggered four-year terms. One commissioner serves as president. The commissioners execute acts legislated by the council, collect revenue, and manage the county government.

Court: The county maintains a circuit court which was established January 1, 2009. The first Judge of the Switzerland Circuit Court is W. Gregory Coy. The Judge is elected to a term of six years. The Court is a general jurisdiction court, meaning it handles all types of cases. The Judge must be a licensed attorney. All decisions of the Court are appealable to the Indiana Court of Appeals or the Indiana Supreme Court.

County Officials: The county has other elected offices, including sheriff, coroner, auditor, treasurer, recorder, surveyor, and circuit court clerk. They are elected to four-year terms. Members elected to county government positions are required to declare party affiliations and to be residents of the county.

Switzerland County is part of Indiana's 6th congressional district.

Demographics

2010 census
As of the 2010 United States Census, there were 10,613 people, 4,034 households, and 2,847 families in the county. The racial makeup of the county was 97.8% white, 0.3% black or African American, 0.2% Asian, 0.2% American Indian, 0.7% from other races, and 0.8% from two or more races. Those of Hispanic or Latino origin made up 1.4% of the population. In terms of ancestry, 25.4% were German, 16.1% were American, 13.2% were Irish, and 10.1% were English.

Of the 4,034 households, 33.5% had children under the age of 18 living with them, 54.2% were married couples living together, 10.0% had a female householder with no husband present, 29.4% were non-families, and 24.3% of all households were made up of individuals. The average household size was 2.60 and the average family size was 3.07. The median age was 39.1 years.

The median income for a household in the county was $47,697 and the median income for a family was $51,769. Males had a median income of $39,167 versus $30,814 for females. The per capita income for the county was $21,214. About 11.0% of families and 14.4% of the population were below the poverty line, including 19.2% of those under age 18 and 7.5% of those age 65 or over.

See also
 National Register of Historic Places listings in Switzerland County, Indiana

References

 
Indiana counties
1814 establishments in Indiana Territory
Populated places established in 1814
Indiana counties on the Ohio River